The Gulf Coast Museum of Art was located at 12211 Walsingham Road, Largo, Florida.  It housed contemporary Florida art in the permanent collection.

The museum closed in January 2009 after 73 years of operation, and its collections are now part of the Florida International Museum at St. Petersburg College in St. Petersburg, Florida.

Notes

Art museums and galleries in Florida
Defunct museums in Florida
Buildings and structures in Largo, Florida
Museums in Pinellas County, Florida
2009 disestablishments in Florida
Art museums disestablished in 2009